Sitka is an impact crater on the planet Mars.  It measures  in diameter and was named after the city of Sitka in Alaska, United States. The name was approved by the International Astronomical Union in 1976.

References 
 

Impact craters on Mars
Margaritifer Sinus quadrangle